The 2010–11 PlusLiga was the 75th season of the Polish Volleyball Championship, the 11th season as a professional league organized by the Professional Volleyball League SA under the supervision of the Polish Volleyball Federation.

PGE Skra Bełchatów won their 7th title of the Polish Champions.

Regular season

|}

Playoffs

1st round

Semifinals 7–10
(to 3 victories)

|}

|}

2nd round

Semifinals 1–4
(to 3 victories)

|}

|}

3rd round

9th place
(to 4 victories)

|}

5th place
(to 3 victories)

|}

3rd place
(to 3 victories)

|}

Finals
(to 3 victories)

|}

Final standings

References

External links
 Official website 

PlusLiga
PlusLiga
PlusLiga
PlusLiga
PlusLiga